The Maggia is a river in the Swiss canton of Ticino.

The springs are near the Cristallina mountain at 8136 ft (2480 m). The river runs through the Val Sambuco, the Val Lavizzara, and the Valle Maggia, and enters Lago Maggiore between Ascona and Locarno. The village Maggia is situated on the river.

The river is used for hydroelectric power production, e.g. with the dams of Lago del Narèt and Lago del Sambuco near the sources.

The Maggia river is a popular scuba diving spot due to its crystal clear waters.

The name of the river derives from the name of the village Maggia.

In the 1990s the river had a European record: the river that grew fastest during rains. This characteristic led to many tragedies in the past. One involved the collapse of a bridge connecting the old Maggia to Aurigeno and Moghegno which killed many people in the 1970s.

References

External links
Ofima  electricity producer

Rivers of Ticino
Rivers of Switzerland